Beverly Lucy Garland (née Fessenden; October 17, 1926 – December 5, 2008) was an American actress. Her work in feature films primarily consisted of small parts in a few major productions or leads in low-budget action or science-fiction movies. On television, however, she had prominent recurring roles on several popular series.

She may be best remembered as Barbara Harper Douglas, the woman who married widower Steve Douglas (Fred MacMurray) in the latter years of the sitcom My Three Sons. She played in that role from 1969 until the series concluded in 1972. In the 1980s, she co-starred as Dotty West, the mother of Kate Jackson's character, in the CBS television series Scarecrow and Mrs. King. She had a recurring role as Ginger Jackson on 7th Heaven. In 1957–1958, she starred in the TV crime-drama Decoy, which ran for 39 episodes.

Early life and career

Beverly Lucy Fessenden was born on October 17, 1926, in Santa Cruz, California, the daughter of Amelia Rose (née Scherer), a businesswoman, and James Atkins Fessenden, a singer and salesman. Garland grew up in Glendale, California. She was a drama student of Anita Arliss. The family subsequently moved to Phoenix, Arizona, where she graduated from North High School. She was a student at Glendale City College, and she honed her acting skills in summer stock theatre.

Garland played Nina in the drama Mama Rosa in 1950. In the 1950s, many of her roles were of secure, tough women who could handle themselves in violent situations. One such role was as a secrets-keeping secretary in D.O.A.. In 1956, she played a female marshal in the Western Gunslinger with Chris Alcaide as her deputy; a prison escapee in Swamp Diamonds; and a scientist's wife who battles an alien in It Conquered the World. All three films were directed by Roger Corman, and all were parodied in the 1990s by Mystery Science Theater 3000.

Television success

From 1957 to 1958, Garland starred as undercover police officer Casey Jones in the television series Decoy, the first American television police series with a woman in the starring role. It lasted for a single season of 39 episodes.

Garland guest-starred in 1956 as Nelli Austin, a rodeo sharpshooter, in the episode "Rodeo Rough House" of Rod Cameron's syndicated drama series State Trooper. Claude Akins appeared in this episode as the murderous rodeo clown. Garland and Akins appeared together again in the 1960 episode "Prison  Trail" of the TV series Wanted: Dead or Alive and again in the 1963 episode "The Chooser of the Slain" of The Dakotas. Garland and Akins also appeared in The Zane Grey Theatre episodes "Courage is a Gun" and "Jericho".

In 1955, Garland had been cast in the episode "Man Down, Woman Screaming" of Rod Cameron's first syndicated series, City Detective. On September 5, 1955, she co-starred in an episode of Science Fiction Theatre called "The Negative Man". Around the same time, she appeared in the first Brian Keith series, Crusader. In 1959, Garland was cast as the wife of a bounty hunter in Season 2, Episode 2 of Rawhide "Incident of the Roman Candles".  She appeared twice in 1960 as Doris Denny Bona in the episodes "Remember the Alamo" and "The Widow of Kill Cove" of Cameron's third syndicated series, Coronado 9. In 1960, Garland was cast as Dr. Nora James in the episode "Three Graves" of Riverboat.

Garland also appeared in 1960 in episode 28, "Saddles and Spurs", of the first season of the Western show Laramie.

In 1962–1963, Garland was a regular on the CBS version of Stump the Stars.

In 1963, she starred as “Leah”, a bar girl in the Long Branch who loses her fiancée, then is revived in life in the Gunsmoke episode “The Odyssey of Jubal Tanner” (S8E36).

She appeared in a season-one episode, "Smoke Screen", of The Fugitive. In the 1964–1965 television season, she co-starred as Ellie Collins on The Bing Crosby Show. She appeared in the 1968 feature film Pretty Poison, but is best known for playing suburban mothers on My Three Sons and Scarecrow and Mrs. King.

In 1974, Garland went under the ape makeup for an episode of the Planet of the Apes television series. The episode was called "The Interrogation" and she played a rather cunning chimpanzee who tries, through brainwashing, to get answers from the captured Pete Burke.

In the 1980s, she co-starred as Dotty West, the mother of Kate Jackson's character for the entire four-season run of the CBS television series Scarecrow and Mrs. King.
She also featured in two episodes of  Remington Steele as the mother of Laura Holt (played by series star Stephanie Zimbalist) in the early 1980s and in six episodes of Lois and Clark: The New Adventures of Superman as the mother of Lois Lane in the mid-1990s.  Her decades of television guest appearances included episodes of Twilight Zone, Kung Fu, and The Mary Tyler Moore Show.

On 7th Heaven, she appeared in nine episodes as Ginger Jackson, the stepmother of Annie Camden, opposite Graham Jarvis. In addition to working with Peter Graves on 7th Heaven, Garland also starred opposite Graves's brother, James Arness, in four episodes of Gunsmoke. On radio, she was an original player of the California Actors Radio Theatre, which often recorded its programs on the grounds of Garland's hotel in the Beverly Garland Little Theater, which was decorated with large movie posters from many of her feature films.

Recognition
Garland was nominated for a Best Actress in a Single Performance Emmy Award for her work on Medic (1955). For her contribution to the television industry, Garland has a star on the Hollywood Walk of Fame at 6801 Hollywood Boulevard. It was dedicated on January 26, 1983.

Personal life
Garland married actor Richard Garland in 1951. Although they divorced two years later, she continued to use his last name professionally.

In 1999, her husband of 39 years, businessman Filmore Crank, died. They had two children together, and two from Crank's previous marriage.

Subsequently, Garland combined her acting career with an increased devotion to the hotel that Crank built and named for her. Originally built as a Howard Johnson's Motor Lodge in the 1970s, it became a 255-room Spanish Mission-style resort called Beverly Garland's Holiday Inn, and was renamed The Garland in 2014.

Variety, on December 7, 2008, wrote that she was the honorary mayor of North Hollywood and that she served on the boards of the California Tourism Corporation as well as the Greater Los Angeles Visitors' and Convention Bureau.

Death
On December 5, 2008, Garland died from natural causes at her home of over 40 years in the Hollywood Hills after a lengthy illness.

Several hundred people attended a memorial service and reception on December 13 at her namesake hotel property. Her body was cremated. She was survived by a son, a daughter, and two grandchildren.

Selected filmography

References

External links 
 
 
 Beverly Garland's Universal Studios Hollywood Hotel
 Obituary in the Los Angeles Daily News

1926 births
2008 deaths
20th-century American actresses
American film actresses
American television actresses
Actresses from Santa Cruz, California
Actresses from Los Angeles
Businesspeople from California
20th-century American businesspeople
20th-century American businesswomen
21st-century American women